FOMO is the 2011 album by New Zealand artist Liam Finn. The title is an acronym for the term "Fear Of Missing Out".

Track listing 

All songs were written by Liam Finn, except where noted

 "Neurotic World"
 "Don't Even Know Your Name"
 "Roll of the Eye"
 "Cold Feet"
 "Real Late" (Liam Finn, Jeremy Toy)
 "The Struggle"
 "Little Words"
 "Reckless"
 "Chase the Seasons"
 "Jump Your Bones"

Bonus Track
 "Life Isn't Stationary"

Personnel 

 Liam Finn - vocals
 Seamus Ebbs - Outro drums on 'Real Late'
 Glenn Kotche - Contact mic drums on 'Real Late' and 'Jump Your Bones'

Credits 
 Artwork - Sarah Larnach
 Design - Anns Taylor
 Engineer (Mixing Assistant) - Benjamin Knapp, Jeremy Toy, Jordan Stone, Liam Finn
 Engineer (Recording Assistant) - Benjamin Knapp
 Mastered by Steve Fallone
 Mixed by Tchad Blake (Tracks 1-4), Burke Reid (Tracks 5-10)
 Producers - Burke Reid, Liam Finn
 Recorded by Burke Reid

Notes 

The album was released on CD, digital and 180 gram gatefold vinyl formats. The vinyl release include a download card for the bonus track 'Roll of the Eye (Live)'

Some versions of the CD came with a copy of the 2010 debut album from BARB, a side project featuring Liam Finn, Connan Mockasin, Lawrence Arabia, Eliza Jane Barnes, Seamus Ebbs, Jol Mulholland and Wild Bill Rickets.

References

Liam Finn albums
2011 albums
Yep Roc Records albums